George Hill may refer to:

Arts
 George Birkbeck Hill (1835–1903), English editor and author
 George William Hill (sculptor) (1862–1934), Canadian sculptor
 George Hill (director) (1895–1934), American film director (The Big House)
 George Snow Hill (1898–1969), American painter and sculptor
 George Roy Hill (1921–2002), American film director (Butch Cassidy and the Sundance Kid and The Sting)

Politics
 Sir George Hill, 2nd Baronet (1763–1839) of the Hill baronets of Brook Hall, MP for Londonderry
 George Stilman Hill (1794–1858), American-born Canadian lawyer and politician (New Brunswick)
 Lord George Hill (1801–1879), Anglo-Irish politician and landowner
 George Hill (Australian politician) (1802–1883), member of the New South Wales Legislative Council and Mayor of Sydney

 George F. Hill (1832–1910), Canadian lawyer, merchant and politician (New Brunswick)
 George Hill (Idaho politician) (1868–1958), American politician from Idaho
 George Hill (Maine politician) (1903–?), American politician from Maine

Sports
 George Rowland Hill (1855–1928), English sporting administrator, official and referee
 George Hill (cricketer) (born 2001), English cricketer
 George Hill (runner) (1891–1944), long-distance runner from New Zealand
 George Hill (sprinter) (1901–1992), sprinter from the United States
 George Hill (figure skater) (1907–2002), American figure skating champion
 George Hill (racing driver) (1886–1967), American racecar driver
 George Hill (footballer) (1921–2002), Scottish football player and manager (Dundee, East Fife, Montrose)
 George Hill (basketball) (born 1986), American basketball player for the Indiana Pacers
 George Hill (American football) (active 1960–1999), American football coach
 George Hill (ice hockey), Canadian ice hockey player and coach

Other
 George Hill (minister) (1750–1819), Scottish minister and academic
 Sir George Hill, 3rd Baronet (1804–1845) of the Hill baronets of Brook Hall
 George William Hill (1838–1914), American mathematician and astronomer
 George Hill (Medal of Honor) (1844–?), American Medal of Honor recipient
 Sir George Rowley Hill, 7th Baronet (1864–1954), of the Hill baronets of Brook Hall
 Sir George Hill, 5th Baronet (1866–1878), of the Hill baronets of Brook Hall
 Sir George Francis Hill (1867–1948), director of the British Museum
 George R. Hill (1884–1971), American leader in The Church of Jesus Christ of Latter-day Saints
 George Washington Hill (1884–1946), American cigarette marketer
 Sir George Cyril Rowley Hill, 8th Baronet (1890–1980), of the Hill baronets of Brook Hall
 George Alexander Hill (1892–1968), British intelligence officer
 Sir George Alfred Rowley Hill, 9th Baronet (1899–1985), of the Hill baronets of Brook Hall
 George Watts Hill (1901–1993), American banker, hospital administrator and philanthropist
 George W. Hill (pastor) (1916–2003), American religious leader and peace activist
 George R. Hill III (1921–2001), American chemist and authority on coal, leader in The Church of Jesus Christ of Latter-day Saints
 George Hill (chef) (born 1942), Australian Black Hat chef
 George Hill (agronomist) (1938–2017), New Zealand agronomist
 George Heywood Hill (1906–1986), British bookseller

See also 
 George Chatterton-Hill (1883–1947), Irish author of books on evolution and sociology
 Dr. George E. Hill House, historic house in Indianola on Merritt Island, Florida
 George Hill, Anguilla, one of the fourteen Districts of Anguilla
 George M. Hill Company, publishing company based in Chicago, Illinois
 George Hills (1816–1895), Canadian Anglican bishop
 George Edwin Hills (1905–1978), Canadian painter, contractor and politician (British Columbia)
 George Hills (historian) (1918–2002), British journalist and historian
 George W. Hill Correctional Facility, a prison located in Delaware County, Pennsylvania
 St George's Hill, private estate in Weybridge, Surrey, United Kingdom
 St. George's Hill, Saskatchewan, a hamlet
 Hill (surname)